Thiwanka Ranasinghe (born 5 September 1992) is a Sri Lankan male boxer. He has competed for Sri Lanka at the 2016 South Asian Games claiming a bronze medal in the men's 49 kg category.

Thiwanka made his Commonwealth Games debut at the 2018 Commonwealth Games representing Sri Lanka and claimed a bronze medal in the men's 46-49kg event after losing the semi-final bout to England's Galal Yafai. He also became the first male boxer from Sri Lanka since 68 years to win a Commonwealth Games medal after Albert Perera who claimed a gold medal at the 1950 Commonwealth Games.

References 

1992 births
Living people
Sri Lankan male boxers
Boxers at the 2018 Commonwealth Games
Commonwealth Games bronze medallists for Sri Lanka
Commonwealth Games medallists in boxing
Boxers at the 2018 Asian Games
South Asian Games bronze medalists for Sri Lanka
Asian Games competitors for Sri Lanka
South Asian Games medalists in boxing
Light-flyweight boxers
20th-century Sri Lankan people
21st-century Sri Lankan people
Medallists at the 2018 Commonwealth Games